The Teslin River is a river in southern Yukon Territory and northwestern British Columbia, Canada, that flows  from its source south of Teslin Lake to its confluence with the Yukon River.

During the Klondike Gold Rush of 1896–99, the river became a popular route to the Klondike gold fields near Dawson City with the stampeders who had crossed the Coast Mountains by routes such as the Chilkoot Trail or the White Pass trail.

The English name of the Teslin River is derived from native names. In the local Tutchone language. spoken north of the lake it was called Délin Chú  and the Chilkat Tlingit called it Deisleen Héeni. In the Tlingit language the local kwaan or tribe of Inland Tlingit call themselves Deisleen Kwáan", meaning "Big Sinew Tribe".  Prospectors and explorers passing through the region recorded that the local natives called the river Teslin-tuh or Teslin-too, from which we get the English name.  The portion of the river upstream of the lake (south of the lake) was officially designated the Whiteswan River from 1904 to 1951.  The other major feeder streams of the system, via Teslin Lake, are the Jennings River, from the southeast, and the Swift River, from the east-northeast.

Black Spruce is a significant tree within the Teslin River watershed.

See also
List of rivers of British Columbia
List of rivers of Yukon

References
 C. Michael Hogan, Black Spruce: Picea mariana, GlobalTwitcher.com, ed. Nicklas Stromberg, November, 2008
 Andrew Hope III, Alaska Native Knowledge Network. 2000. Map of Tlingit Kwaans and Territories
 Parks Canada. 1976. Wild Rivers: Yukon Territory, Published by Wild Rivers Survey, Planning Division, Parks Canada, 84 pages

Line notes

Rivers of British Columbia
Rivers of Yukon
Atlin District
Cassiar Country
Tributaries of the Yukon River